This article shows all participating team squads at the 2019 Men's European Volleyball Championship, held in France, Slovenia, Belgium and Netherlands from 13 to 29 September 2019.

Pool A

The following is the Bulgarian roster in the 2019 European Championship.

Head Coach:  Silvano Prandi

The following is the French roster in the 2019 European Championship.

Head Coach: Laurent Tillie

The following is the Greek roster in the 2019 European Championship.

Head Coach: Dimitris Andreopoulos

The following is the Italian roster in the 2019 European Championship.

Head Coach: Gianlorenzo Blengini

The following is the Portuguese roster in the 2019 European Championship.

Head Coach: Carlos Prata, Hugo Silva

The following is the Romanian roster in the 2019 European Championship.

Head Coach: Danut Pascu

Pool B

The following is the Austrian roster in the 2019 European Championship.

Head Coach:  Michael Warm

The following is the Belgian roster in the 2019 European Championship.

Head Coach: Brecht Van Kerckhove

The following is the German roster in the 2019 European Championship.

Head Coach:  Andrea Giani

The following is the Serbian roster in the 2019 European Championship.

Head coach: Slobodan Kovač

The following is the Slovak roster in the 2019 European Championship.

Head Coach:  Andrej Kravárik

The following is the Spanish roster in the 2019 European Championship.

Head Coach: Fernando Muñoz

Pool C

The following is the Belarisian roster in the 2019 European Championship.

Head Coach: Viktar Beksha

The following is the Finnish roster in the 2019 European Championship.

Head Coach:  Joel Banks

The following is the Macedonian roster in the 2019 European Championship.

Head Coach:  Nikola Matijašević

The following is the Russian roster in the 2019 European Championship.

Head Coach:  Tuomas Sammelvuo

The following is the Slovenian roster in the 2019 European Championship.

Head Coach:  Alberto Giuliani

The following is the Turkish roster in the 2019 European Championship.

Head Coach: Nedim Özbey

Pool D

The following is the Czech roster in the 2019 European Championship.

Head Coach: Michal Nekola

The following is the Estonian roster in the  2019 European Championship.

Head Coach:  Gheorghe Creţu

The following is the Montenegrin roster in the 2019 European Championship.

Head Coach:  Veljko Basić

The following is the Polish roster in the 2019 European Championship.

Head Coach:  Vital Heynen

The following is the Dutch roster in the 2019 European Championship.

Head Coach:  Roberto Piazza

The following is the Ukrainian roster in the 2019 European Championship.

Head Coach:  Uģis Krastiņš

See also
2019 Women's European Volleyball Championship squads

References

External links
CEV website 

E
Men's European Volleyball Championship